Günəhir (also, Gyunagir and Gyunagyar) is a village and municipality in the Lankaran Rayon of Azerbaijan.  It has a population of 845.

References 

Populated places in Lankaran District